The 1996 Cricket World Cup, also called the Wills World Cup 1996 after the Wills Navy Cut brand produced by tournament sponsor ITC, was the sixth Cricket World Cup organised by the International Cricket Council (ICC). It was the second World Cup to be hosted by Pakistan and India (who had also hosted the 1987 Cricket World Cup) but Sri Lanka were hosts for the first time. The tournament was won by Sri Lanka, who defeated Australia by seven wickets in the final on 17 March 1996 at the Gaddafi Stadium in Lahore, Pakistan.

Hosts

The World Cup was played in India, Pakistan and Sri Lanka. India hosted 17 matches at 17 different venues, while Pakistan hosted 16 matches at 6 venues and Sri Lanka hosted 4 matches at 3 venues.

Controversy dogged the tournament before any games were played; Australia and the West Indies refused to send their teams to Sri Lanka following the bombing of Central Bank in Colombo by the Tamil Tigers in January 1996. Sri Lanka, in addition to offering maximum security to the teams, questioned the validity of citing security concerns when the International Cricket Council had determined it was safe. After extensive negotiations, the ICC ruled that Sri Lanka would be awarded both games on forfeit. As a result of this decision, Sri Lanka automatically qualified for the quarter-finals before playing a game.

India

Pakistan

Sri Lanka

 Two matches were scheduled to be played at Premadasa Stadium, but neither took place as Australia and the West Indies declined to play in Sri Lanka.

Squads

Teams
All the Test-playing nations participated in the competition, including Zimbabwe, who became the ninth Test-status member of the ICC following the last World Cup. The three Associate teams (previously one) to qualify through the 1994 ICC Trophy – the United Arab Emirates, Kenya and the Netherlands – also made their World Cup debuts in 1996. The Netherlands lost all of their five matches, including a defeat to the UAE, while Kenya recorded a surprise victory over the West Indies in Pune.

Summary
The Sri Lankans, coached by Dav Whatmore and captained by Arjuna Ranatunga, used Man of the Series Sanath Jayasuriya and Romesh Kaluwitharana as opening batsmen to take advantage of the fielding restrictions during the first 15 overs of each innings. At a time when 50 or 60 runs in the first 15 overs was considered adequate, Sri Lanka scored 117 runs in those overs against India, 123 against Kenya, 121 against England in the quarter-final and 86 against India in the semi-final. Against Kenya, Sri Lanka made 398 for 5, a new record for the highest team score in a One Day International that stood until April 2006. Gary Kirsten scored 188 not out against United Arab Emirates at Rawalpindi, Pakistan. This became the highest individual score ever in any World Cup match until it was surpassed by first Chris Gayle of the West Indies and later Martin Guptill who scored 215 and 237 respectively in the 2015 Cricket World Cup.

Sri Lanka won the first semi-final over India at Eden Gardens in Calcutta, in front of a crowd unofficially estimated at 110,000. After they had lost both openers cheaply, Sri Lanka launched a counter-attack, led by Aravinda de Silva, to post a strong total of 251 for the loss of 8 wickets. India began their chase promisingly but after the loss of Sachin Tendulkar, the Indian batting order collapsed. After India had slumped to 120 for 8 in the 35th over, sections of the crowd began to throw fruit and plastic bottles onto the field. The players left the field for 20 minutes in an attempt to quieten the crowd. When the players returned for play, more bottles were thrown onto the field and fires were lit in the stand. Match referee Clive Lloyd awarded the match to Sri Lanka, the first default ever in a Test or One Day International.

In the second semi-final in Mohali, Australia recovered from 15/4 to reach 207/8 from their 50 overs. The West Indians had reached 165/2 in the 42nd over before losing their last eight wickets for 37 runs in 50 balls.

Sri Lanka won the toss in the final and sent Australia in to bat despite the team batting first having won all five previous World Cup finals. Mark Taylor top scored with 74 in Australia's total of 241/7. Sri Lanka won the match in the 47th over with Aravinda de Silva following his 3 for 42 with an unbeaten 107 to win the Player of the Match award. It was the first time a tournament host or co-host had won the cricket World Cup.

Group stage

Group A

Group B

Knockout stage

Quarter-finals

Semi-finals

Final

Sri Lanka won the toss and chose to field. Mark Taylor (74 from 83 balls, 8 fours, 1 six) and Ricky Ponting (45 from 73 balls, 2 fours) shared a second-wicket partnership of 101 runs. When Ponting and Taylor were dismissed, however, Australia fell from 137/1 to 170/5 as the famed four-pronged spin attack of Sri Lanka took its toll. Despite the slump, Australia struggled on to 241/7 from their 50 overs.

Statistics

List of centuries

Notes and references

External links
Cricket World Cup 1996  from ESPNcricinfo

 
World Cup
World Cup
World Cup
International cricket competitions from 1994–95 to 1997
Cricket World Cup tournaments
International cricket competitions in India
International cricket competitions in Pakistan
International cricket competitions in Sri Lanka
Cricket World Cup
Cricket World Cup
ITC Limited